Steve John Duich (born February 28, 1946) is a former American football guard in the National Football League for the Atlanta Falcons and the Washington Redskins.  He played college football at San Diego State University.

NFL career
Duich was drafted by the Green Bay Packers with the ninth pick of the 5th round of the 1968 NFL/AFL common draft. The Packers had obtained this pick on July 30, 1967, in a trade with the Pittsburgh Steelers. In exchange, the Steelers received quarterback Kent Nix. Exactly one year later, on July 30, 1968, the Packers traded again. This time, they traded Duich to the Atlanta Falcons for kicker Wade Traynham, who the Packers cut on August 26, 1968.

References

1946 births
Living people
Players of American football from Long Beach, California
American football offensive guards
San Diego State Aztecs football players
Atlanta Falcons players
Washington Redskins players